The Duchy of Lancaster Act 1779 (19 Geo 3 c 45) was an Act of the Parliament of Great Britain.

This Act was partly in force in Great Britain at the end of 2010.

Section 1(1) of, and Group 3 of Part VII of Schedule 1 to, the Statute Law (Repeals) Act 1989 repealed:
Sections 4 and 6
Section 7 from "and also" to "for ever"
Sections 8, 9 and 11 
Section 12 so far as it related to assurances for enfranchisement
Section 13 from "or by the enfranchisement" to "hereditaments"

References
Halsbury's Statutes,

External links
The Duchy of Lancaster Act 1779, as amended, from Legislation.gov.uk

Great Britain Acts of Parliament 1779
Duchy of Lancaster